Wawa Pictures is an independent television production company based in Singapore. It has produced dramas such as Three Wishes (2014), Crescendo (2015), Fire Up (2016) and Doppelganger (2018). Recent variety shows include Markets in Asia (2016) and Sherlock at Work (2016) hosted by Quan Yi Fong and Vivian Lai / Pornsak respectively.

On 14 November 2015, a Xinyao concert The Crescendo Concert – an extension of the 2015 drama Crescendo - was staged by Mediacorp TV Channel 8, record label Ocean Butterflies and Wawa at the Singapore Expo's Max Pavilion.

History
Founded by Molby Low Kian Chye (刘健财), Wawa Pictures was established in Singapore in August 2007 by Singapore's nationwide free-to-air terrestrial channels, Mediacorp TV (formerly Television Corporation of Singapore)'s Channel 5, Channel 8 and Channel U. Currently, its content is distributed to markets like Malaysia, Hong Kong, Indonesia, China and Cambodia.

Productions

Drama

Variety show

Theatre

References

External links
 
 Programme list at Mediacorp

Singapore Chinese dramas
2007 establishments in Singapore